Homochlodes fritillaria, the pale homochlodes, is a species of geometrid moth in the family Geometridae. It is found in North America.

The MONA or Hodges number for Homochlodes fritillaria is 6812.

References

Further reading

 

Lithinini
Articles created by Qbugbot
Moths described in 1858